Block-Heads is a 1938 comedy film directed by John G. Blystone and starring Stan Laurel and Oliver Hardy. It was produced by Hal Roach Studios for Metro-Goldwyn-Mayer. The film, a reworking of elements from the Laurel and Hardy shorts We Faw Down (1928) and Unaccustomed As We Are (1929), was Roach's final film for MGM.

Plot
In the trenches of World War I, Ollie, Stan and the rest of their army company are ready to go 'over the top', but Stan is ordered to stay behind to guard the trench. Scenes of fighting are then followed by the caption 'Armistice'. Twenty years pass, and Stan is still guarding the post, as shown by the huge pile of bean cans he has accumulated, and the path he has worn pacing back and forth on guard. He is found by accident (after firing on a plane he sees approaching) and goes home, feted as a hero. Ollie, who has been married for a year to the formidable Mrs. Hardy (Minna Gombell), sees him in a newspaper and visits him in the Soldiers' Home. He finds Stan in a wheelchair, having apparently lost a leg, and invites him home. However, Stan is in fact just resting in another veteran's wheelchair and Ollie only finds out he still has both legs after pushing him around in the chair and then carrying him. They reach Ollie's automobile, which he says belongs to his wife and is 'practically new', but Stan quickly manages to completely wreck it.

The two men then start to climb thirteen flights of stairs to Ollie's apartment, because they think the elevator is out of order. A man (James Finlayson) insults Ollie, leading to a lengthy argument. Then they run into a brattish kid (Tommy Bond) with a football, which results in Ollie kicking his ball down the stairwell, leading to another argument with the kid's burly father. When Ollie and Stan finally reach the apartment, Ollie's wife disapproves of Ollie bringing home yet another bum, so Ollie has to prepare a meal for Stan, but the pair only succeed in blowing up the kitchen. Ollie's attractive neighbor, Mrs. Gilbert (Patricia Ellis), offers to help clear up the mess, but herself gets soaked and ends up in a pair of Ollie's enormous pajamas. Mrs. Hardy then returns, so Ollie and Stan have to hide her. When Mrs. Hardy finally leaves, Mrs. Gilbert's husband (Billy Gilbert) arrives and when he sees his wife there, he chases Stan and Ollie down the stairs, firing a shotgun. A large number of men jump out of windows.

Cast

Production
 The film was announced as being the last Laurel & Hardy film and it was the last Hal Roach production for Metro-Goldwyn-Mayer.
 Block-Heads was the last film directed by John G. Blystone who died shortly afterwards.
 The original ending in the script had Billy Gilbert seated comfortably in his study, with Stan and Ollie's heads mounted on his trophy wall (Ollie glances at Stan and says, "Well, here's another nice mess you've gotten me into!"). Hal Roach vetoed the idea as "too gruesome", but writer Felix Adler later used the gag at the end of The Three Stooges' 1941 short I'll Never Heil Again.
 The battle scenes at the beginning of the film are recycled footage shot for the 1925 silent film The Big Parade by King Vidor.

References
Notes

Bibliography

 Everson, William K. The Complete Films of Laurel and Hardy. New York: Citadel, 2000, (first edition 1967). .
 Louvish, Simon. Stan and Ollie: The Roots of Comedy. London: Faber & Faber, 2001. . 
 McCabe, John. Babe: The Life of Oliver Hardy. London: Robson Books Ltd., 2004. .
 McCabe, John with Al Kilgore and Richard W. Bann. Laurel & Hardy. New York: Bonanza Books, 1983, first edition 1975, E.P. Dutton. .
 McGarry, Annie. Laurel & Hardy. London: Bison Group, 1992. .

External links 

 
 
 
 

1938 films
1930s war comedy films
American war comedy films
American black-and-white films
Films directed by John G. Blystone
Laurel and Hardy (film series)
Western Front (World War I) films
Metro-Goldwyn-Mayer films
Films with screenplays by Charley Rogers
Films with screenplays by Harry Langdon
Films with screenplays by Felix Adler (screenwriter)
1938 comedy films
1930s English-language films
1930s American films